Laura Reynolds (born 21 January 1989) is an Irish long distance race walker, from Eslinbridge, County Leitrim who competed at the 2012 Summer Olympics in the 20k walk where she finished 18th out of 59 walkers and set a personal best.

She is a graduate of Dublin City University, where she obtained a Degree in PE and Biology.

References

External links
IAAF Profile
RTE Profile
Shannonside Radio

1989 births
Living people
Sportspeople from County Kildare
Irish female racewalkers
Olympic athletes of Ireland
Athletes (track and field) at the 2012 Summer Olympics
Sportspeople from County Leitrim
People from County Leitrim